Papagaio is a Brazilian steakhouse restaurant chain in Israel.

Papagaio may also refer to:

 Rafael Papagaio (born 1999), Brazilian footballer
 Papagayo Peninsula, Costa Rica
 Papagaios, Minas Gerais, Brazil
 Pico do Papagaio, a Pernambuco, Brazil

See also
 Papagaio River (disambiguation)
 Papagayo (disambiguation)